The 1994–95 Chelmsford Chieftains season in British ice hockey statistics are here.

Standings

League standings

See also
Ice hockey in the United Kingdom

References

Chelmsford Chieftains